The West Asian Women's Handball Championship is the official competition organised by the Asian Handball Federation for senior women's national handball teams of Western Asia and takes place every year.

Summary

 Played in February 2018
 Cancelled due to insufficient number of teams

2023

https://asianhandball.org/jordan2023/ 

https://asianhandball.org/jordan2023/s/

https://asianhandball.org/jordan2023/r/
	
Group Standings

Pos	Team	Pld	W	D	L	GF	GA	DIFF	Pts

1	India	6	6	0	0	221	105	116	12

2	Jordan	6	4	0	2	164	133	31	8

3	Iraq	6	2	0	4	134	178	-44	4

4	Kuwait	6	0	0	6	102	205	-103	0

7 February 2023	15 - 41	Kuwait vs India	

7 February 2023	17 - 31	Iraq vs Jordan	

8 February 2023	13 - 40	Iraq vs India	

8 February 2023	16 - 35	Kuwait vs Jordan	

10 February 2023 25 - 34 Kuwait vs Iraq	

10 February 2023	21 - 37	Jordan vs India	

11 February 2023	40 - 12	India vs Kuwait	

11 February 2023	28 - 20	Jordan vs Iraq	

13 February 2023	35 - 23	India vs Iraq	

13 February 2023	28 - 15	Jordan vs Kuwait	

14 February 2023	27 - 19	Iraq vs Kuwait	

14 February 2023	28 - 21	India vs Jordan	

Final Ranking​

    Rank

    Country

    India

    Jordan

    Iraq

    Kuwait

All-Star Team

Award
	
Player

MVP Nidhi Sharma (India)

Right Wing Priyanka Thakur (India)

Right Back Aisha Al-Saad (Kuwait)

Center Back Fallak Obeidat (Jordan)

Left Wing Faten Al-Hamaideh (Jordan)

Left Back Jenan Mahmoud (Iraq)

Pivot Sondos Obeidat (Jordan)

Goalkeeper Diksha Kumari (India)

Medal table

Participating nations

References
 Official Website

External links
https://asianhandball.org/uzbekistan-enjoy-double-success-in-womens-ihf-trophy-in-faisalabad/

Asian Handball Championships
Women's sports competitions in Asia
Recurring sporting events established in 2016